{{Automatic taxobox
| taxon = Cymakra
| image = Cymakra sp. 001.jpg
| image_caption = Cymakra sp. (museum specimen in MNHN, Paris)
| authority =  Gardner, 1937 
| synonyms_ref = 
| synonyms = 
| type_species = † Cymakra poncei
| type_species_authority = J. Gardner, 1937
| subdivision_ranks = Species
| subdivision = See text
| display_parents = 3
}}Cymakra is a genus of sea snails, marine gastropod mollusks in the family Mitromorphidae.

These are epifaunal carnivores occurring in the Gulf of Mexico.

Species
According to the World Register of Marine Species (WoRMS), the following species with a valid name are included within the genus Cymakra :
 Cymakra baileyi McLean & Poorman, 1971 
 Cymakra dubia (Olsson & McGinty, 1958)
 Cymakra granata McLean & Poorman, 1971
 † Cymakra poncei J. Gardner, 1937 
Synonymized species
 Cymakra torticula (Dall, 1889): synonym of Mitromorpha torticula'' (Dall, 1889)

References

 Rosenberg, G., F. Moretzsohn, and E. F. García. 2009. Gastropoda (Mollusca) of the Gulf of Mexico, Pp. 579–699 in Felder, D.L. and D.K. Camp (eds.), Gulf of Mexico–Origins, Waters, and Biota. Biodiversity. Texas A&M Press, College Station, Texas

External links
 Gardner J.A. (1937). The molluscan fauna of the Alum Bluff Group of Florida. Part VI. Pteropoda, Opisthobranchia and Ctenobranchia (in part). United States Geological Survey Professional Paper. 142-F: 251-435, pls 37-48
 Bouchet, P.; Kantor, Y. I.; Sysoev, A.; Puillandre, N. (2011). A new operational classification of the Conoidea (Gastropoda). Journal of Molluscan Studies. 77(3): 273-308